San Millán de la Cogolla is a sparsely populated municipality in La Rioja, (Spain). The village is famous for its twin monasteries, Yuso and Suso (Monasterio de San Millán de Yuso and Monasterio de San Millán de Suso), which were declared a World Heritage Site in 1997.  There were 293 inhabitants registered in 2009, the population having fallen significantly during the twentieth century.

San Millán has a claim to being the birthplace of the Spanish language. The area is Spanish-speaking but some of the local place-names are of Basque origin, and there is evidence that Basque was spoken locally a thousand years ago (see Glosas Emilianenses).

Jews were living here as early as at Nájera, and they suffered greatly in the civil war between Peter of Castile and Henry II of Castile. On October 15, 1369, at the request of the directors of the small aljama of San Millán, whose cause was advocated by "certain Jews who were received at court," Henry II of Castile ordered that "the Christian men and women and the Moorish men and women" should immediately discharge all their debts to the Jews, "that the last-named might be able to pay their taxes the more promptly." On September 10, 1371, however, the king released the abbot and all the monks of San Millán from whatever debts they had contracted with the Jews since the Battle of Nájera.

Etymology 
In a papal bull from 1199 where Privileges were granted to the monasteries of San Millán de la Cogolla it appears with the name Coculla, which comes from the Latin word cuculla, small hill, hilltop; this word is typically used for high sites and those of defensive nature, coming from the times of the Reconquista.
The other part of the name is taken from a 6th-century saint (Saint Emilianus or San Millán) who lived here.

Politics

Notable people
 Juan de San Millán
 Antonio Segura
 María de la O Lejárraga
 Leandro Nieto Bolandier
 Joaquín Peña
 Tarsicio Lejárraga

See also
Aurea of San Millán
Monasteries of San Millán

References

External links
Official website of the monastery of San Millán
Explore the San Millán Yuso and Suso Monasteries (La Rioja, Spain) in the UNESCO collection on Google Arts and Culture
The Art of medieval Spain, A.D. 500-1200, an exhibition catalog from The Metropolitan Museum of Art Libraries (fully available online as PDF), which contains material on San Millán de la Cogolla (see index)

Municipalities in La Rioja (Spain)